Rubén Castro Martín (born 27 June 1981) is a Spanish professional footballer who plays for Málaga CF mainly as a striker but also as a winger.

He represented mainly Las Palmas and Betis during his career, appearing in 282 matches in La Liga and more than 400 in Segunda División. He also competed in China.

Club career

Las Palmas and Deportivo
Born in Las Palmas, Canary Islands, Castro was signed by Deportivo de La Coruña from local UD Las Palmas in 2004, in a deal which also saw Momo moving in the opposite direction. The deal was agreed in order to wipe out the debt that Las Palmas still had after signing Gabriel Schürrer from Deportivo for €3.6 million.

Castro scored his first goals for Las Palmas in La Liga in the 2001–02 season, when he came on as a substitute in the 64th minute of a home fixture against Real Madrid, with the score at 2–2; the match ended 4–2 for the hosts, courtesy of him. In the 2003–04 campaign he was crowned Pichichi Trophy of the Segunda División for his hometown club, netting 22 times – with the team being nonetheless relegated – and being subsequently purchased by Depor.

At the beginning of 2006–07, Castro was on loan at Racing de Santander, but he left Cantabria due to a lack of playing opportunities. During the January transfer window another loan happened, this time to Catalonia's Gimnàstic de Tarragona where he started very well with three goals in his first three matches, although the side would be eventually relegated and the player returned to Deportivo.

After appearing scarcely during the 2007–08 season, Castro was loaned again in July 2008, to newly-promoted second division club SD Huesca. There, his goals proved crucial for the Aragonese as they retained their recently obtained status.

In late August 2009, Castro was again loaned by Deportivo and also in division two, now to Rayo Vallecano. For the second year in a row he repeated team position (11th) and goals scored (14), returning in June to the Galicians.

Betis
In August 2010, Castro was sold to Real Betis for a fee of €1.7 million. The attacking trio of himself, Jorge Molina and midfielder Achille Emaná combined for more than 50 league goals in 2010–11, as the Andalusians returned to the top tier after two years of absence.

Castro scored his first goal in the competition in nearly four years on 27 August 2011, in a local derby at Granada CF (1–0 win, netting five minutes from time). He repeated exactly the same feat the following matchday, against RCD Mallorca.

On 10 December 2011, Castro put a stop to a streak of 11 games without one win for the Pepe Mel-led side with only one point managed, netting twice in stoppage time of the 2–1 home victory over Valencia CF. He finished the campaign with 16 goals – third-best national scorer, eighth overall – as the Verdiblancos finally finished in 13th position.

Castro scored 67 goals in all competitions from 2012 to 2015, including 32 in league in the latter season to help Betis return to the top flight as champions. He celebrated his 200th appearance in the competition with a goal, helping to a 1–1 home draw with Villarreal CF.

In July 2017, aged 36, Castro moved abroad for the first time in his career, being loaned to Chinese Super League club Guizhou Hengfeng Zhicheng F.C. for five months. In his first match upon his return to the Estadio Benito Villamarín, on 15 January 2018, he replaced Sergio León late into the home fixture against CD Leganés and scored the 3–2 winner through a penalty.

Las Palmas return
On 13 July 2018, after cutting ties with Betis, the 37-year-old Castro returned to Las Palmas on a two-year contract. He scored 15 times in the second division in each of his seasons.

Cartagena
Castro agreed to a one-year deal at second-division newcomers FC Cartagena on 12 September 2020. He scored 19 goals during the season, as they avoided relegation.

The following campaign, as the team again managed to stay afloat, Castro scored 20 times.

Málaga
On 7 July 2022, aged 41, Castro signed a one-year contract with Málaga CF.

Personal life
Castro's two older brothers – Rubén was the youngest of five siblings – Guillermo and Alejandro, were also footballers. At one point in their careers, they also represented Las Palmas.

In 2013, his fiancée pressed charges against him for domestic violence. He was released on bail and, two years later, Betis fans offered chants of support to the footballer.

Career statistics

Club

Honours
Betis
Segunda División: 2010–11, 2014–15

Individual
Pichichi Trophy (Segunda División): 2003–04, 2014–15
Segunda División Player of the Month: June 2020

Records
Betis all-time top scorer: 148 goals

Notes

References

External links
Betis official profile 

1981 births
Living people
Spanish footballers
Footballers from Las Palmas
Association football wingers
Association football forwards
La Liga players
Segunda División players
Tercera División players
UD Las Palmas Atlético players
UD Las Palmas players
Deportivo de La Coruña players
Albacete Balompié players
Racing de Santander players
Gimnàstic de Tarragona footballers
SD Huesca footballers
Rayo Vallecano players
Real Betis players
FC Cartagena footballers
Málaga CF players
Chinese Super League players
Guizhou F.C. players
Spain under-21 international footballers
Spanish expatriate footballers
Expatriate footballers in China
Spanish expatriate sportspeople in China